Diaphania exclusalis is a moth in the family Crambidae. It was described by Francis Walker in 1865. It is found in Colombia, Venezuela, Ecuador, Panama, Costa Rica and Mexico.

References

Moths described in 1865
Diaphania